This is a list of schools in Northumberland, England.

State-funded schools

Primary and first schools

Abbeyfields First School, Morpeth
Acomb First School, Acomb
Adderlane Academy, Prudhoe
Allendale Primary School, Allendale
Amble First School, Amble
Amble Links First School, Amble
Beaconhill Community Primary School, Cramlington
Beaufront First School, Sandhoe
Bede Academy, Blyth
Bedlington Station Primary School, Bedlington
Bedlington West End Primary School, Bedlington
Bedlington Whitley Memorial CE Primary School, Bedlington
Belford Primary School, Belford
Bellingham Primary School, Bellingham
Belsay Primary School, Belsay
Berwick St Mary's CE First School, Berwick-upon-Tweed
Bothal Primary School, Ashington
Branton Community Primary School, Branton
Broomhaugh CE First School, Riding Mill
Broomhill First School, Morpeth
Broomley First School, Stocksfield
Burnside Primary School, Cramlington
Cambo First School, Cambo
Cambois Primary School, Cambois
Central Primary School, Ashington
Chollerton CE First School, Barrasford
Choppington Primary School, Choppington
Corbridge CE First School, Corbridge
Cragside CE Primary School, Cramlington
Cramlington Northburn Primary School, Cramlington
Cramlington Shanklea Primary School, Cramlington
Cramlington Village Primary School, Cramlington
Croftway Primary Academy, Blyth
Darras Hall Primary School, Ponteland
Eastlea Primary School, Cramlington
Ellingham CE Primary School, Ellingham
Ellington Primary School, Ellington
Embleton Vincent Edwards CE Primary School, Embleton
Felton CE Primary School, Felton
Grange View CE First School, Widdrington Village
Greenhaugh Primary School, Greenhaugh
Greenhead CE Primary School, Greenhead
Haltwhistle Primary Academy, Haltwhistle
Harbottle CE First School, Harbottle
Hareside Primary School, Cramlington
Heddon-on-the-Wall St Andrew's CE Primary School, Heddon-on-the-Wall
Henshaw CE Primary School, Henshaw
Hexham First School, Hexham
Hipsburn Primary School, Lesbury
Holy Island CE First School, Lindisfarne
Holy Trinity CE First School, Berwick-upon-Tweed
Holywell Village First School, Holywell
Horton Grange Primary School, Blyth
Hugh Joicey CE Aided First School, Ford
Humshaugh CE First School, Humshaugh
Kielder Primary School and Nursery, Kielder
Linton Primary School, Linton
Longhorsley St Helen's CE First School, Longhorsley
Longhoughton CE Primary School, Longhoughton
Lowick CE First School, Lowick
Malvin's Close Academy, Blyth
Meadowdale Academy, Bedlington
Mickley First School, Mickley
Morpeth All Saints CE First School, Morpeth
Morpeth First School, Morpeth
Morpeth Road Academy, Blyth
Morpeth Stobhillgate First School, Morpeth
Mowbray Primary School, Guide Post
NCEA Bishop's Primary School, Ashington
NCEA Warkworth CE Primary School, Warkworth
New Delaval Primary School, New Delaval
New Hartley First School, New Hartley
Newbrough CE Primary School, Fourstones
Newsham Primary School, Blyth
Norham St Ceolwulf's CE First School, Norham
Otterburn Primary School, Otterburn
Ovingham CE First School, Ovingham
Pegswood Primary School, Morpeth
Ponteland Community Primary School, Ponteland
Ponteland Primary School, Ponteland
Prudhoe Castle First School, Prudhoe
Prudhoe West Academy, Prudhoe
Red Row First School, Morpeth
Richard Coates CE Primary School, Ponteland
Ringway Primary School, Guide Post
Rothbury First School, Rothbury
St Aidan's RC Primary School, Ashington
St Bede's RC Primary School, Bedlington
St Cuthbert's RC First School, Berwick-upon-Tweed
St Mary's RC First School, Hexham
St Matthew's RC Primary School, Prudhoe
St Michael's CE First School, Alnwick
St Paul's RC Primary School, Alnwick
St Robert's RC First School, Morpeth
St Wilfrid's RC Primary School, Blyth
Ss Peter and Paul's RC Primary Academy, Cramlington
Scremerston First School, Scremerston
Seahouses Primary School, Seahouses
Seaton Delaval First School, Seaton Delaval
Seaton Sluice First School, Seaton Sluice
Seghill First School, Seghill
The Sele First School, Hexham
Shaftoe Trust Academy, Haydon Bridge
Shilbottle Primary School, Shilbottle
Slaley First School, Slaley
Spittal Community School, Spittal
Stakeford Primary School, Stakeford
Stamfordham Primary School, Stamfordham
Stannington First School, Stannington
Stead Lane Primary School, Bedlington
Swansfield Park Primary School, Alnwick
Swarland Primary School, Swarland
Thropton Village First School, Thropton
Tritlington CE First School, Tritlington
Tweedmouth Prior Park First School, Tweedmouth
Tweedmouth West First School, Tweedmouth
Wark CE Primary School, Wark on Tyne
Whalton CE Primary School, Whalton
Whitfield CE Primary School, Whitfield
Whitley Chapel CE First School, Whitley Chapel
Whittingham CE Primary School, Whittingham
Whittonstall First School, Whittonstall
Wooler First School, Wooler
Wylam First School, Wylam

Middle schools

Bellingham Middle School & Sports College, Bellingham
Berwick Middle School, Berwick-upon-Tweed
Corbridge Middle School, Corbridge
Dr Thomlinson CE Middle School, Rothbury
Glendale Middle School, Wooler
Hexham Middle School, Hexham
Highfield Middle School, Prudhoe
James Calvert Spence College, Amble
Morpeth Chantry Middle School, Morpeth
Morpeth Newminster Middle School, Morpeth
Ovingham Middle School, Ovingham
St Joseph's RC Middle School, Hexham
Seaton Sluice Middle School, Seaton Sluice
Tweedmouth Community Middle School, Spittal
Whytrig Middle School, Seaton Delaval

Secondary and high schools

Ashington Academy, Ashington
Astley Community High School, Seaton Delaval
Bede Academy, Blyth
Bedlington Academy, Bedlington
Berwick Academy, Spittal
The Blyth Academy, Blyth
Cramlington Learning Village, Cramlington
The Duchess's Community High School, Alnwick
Haydon Bridge High School, Haydon Bridge
James Calvert Spence College, Amble
The King Edward VI School, Morpeth
NCEA Duke's Secondary School, Ashington
Ponteland High School, Ponteland
Prudhoe Community High School, Prudhoe
Queen Elizabeth High School, Hexham
St Benet Biscop Catholic Academy, Bedlington

Special and alternative schools

Atkinson House School, Seghill
Barndale House School, Alnwick
Cleaswell Hill School, Guide Post
Collingwood School & Media Arts College, Morpeth
Cramlington Hillcrest School, Cramlington
The Dales School, Blyth
The Grove Special School, Tweedmouth
Hexham Priory School, Hexham
NCEA Castle School, Ashington
Northumberland Pupil Referral Unit, Stannington

Further education
Northumberland College

Independent schools

Primary and preparatory schools
Mowden Hall School, Newton

Senior and all-through schools
Longridge Towers School, Berwick-upon-Tweed

Special and alternative schools
Buzz Learning Independent Specialist School, Ashington
Gust Independent School, Ashington
Howard House School, Bedlington
Nunnykirk Centre for Dyslexia, Nunnykirk
Rosewood Independent School, Ashington

Further education
Cambian Dilston College

External links
List of schools - Northumberland County Council Website

Northumberland
Schools in Northumberland
Lists of buildings and structures in Northumberland